Creekmoor is a suburb of Poole in Dorset, England, with a population of 9,257, reducing to 9,180 at the 2011 census. Bordered by the Upton Heath Nature Reserve and Upton Country Park, the area is mainly populated by families. The suburb is represented by two local councillors, Judy Butt of the Conservative Party and Diana Butler of the United Kingdom Independence Party.

Facilities

Church 

 Christ Church

Pub 

 The Acorn

Cafés and restaurants 

 Creekmoor Plaice
 Little Village
 The Tearooms

Schools 

 Hillbourne Primary School
 Happy Days Nursery & Preschool
 Christchurch Creekmoor Little Oaks Preschool

Library 

 Creekmoor Library

Politics 
Creekmoor is part of the Creekmoor ward which elects two councillors to Bournemouth, Christchurch and Poole Council, and also the Poole parliamentary constituency.

References

External links

 

Areas of Poole